Instrumentals: The Best of the Chrysalis Years is a 2003 compilation of American guitarist Leo Kottke's releases on the Chrysalis label. It includes previously unreleased tracks. The  Chrysalis  release Essential covers the same time period, presenting a different line up of tracks.

Reception

Writing for Allmusic, music critic Ronnie D. Lankford Jr. wrote of the album "The tracks flow in chronological order, allowing the listener to follow the guitarist's evolution over his eight years with Chrysalis; and while the albums he recorded during this time may lack the edginess of his earlier material, the pieces on Instrumentals are consistently fresh and invigorating. Guitar hero wannabes, of course, will buy the album for the extra tracks; everyone else will find it a rewarding introduction to mid-period Kottke."

Track listing
All songs by Leo Kottke except as noted.
All tracks are excerpted from Leo Kottke, Burnt Lips, Balance, Guitar Music, Live in Europe and Time Step, except as noted.
’’The Fisherman’’ is a previously unreleased live recording from a Montreux Jazz Festival appearance in 1977.
The short version of "Little Martha" is a previously unreleased version.
The version of "Airproofing" represented here is the original, not the later extended version.
 "Airproofing" – 2:18
 "Waltz" – 2:25
 "Death by Reputation" – 4:10
 "The Fisherman" – 2:48
 "Up Tempo" – 1:53
 "A Low Thud" – 3:07
 "Orange Room" – 3:32
 "Whine" – 3:32
 "Dolores" – 4:11
 "The Train and the Gate" – 2:42
 "Open Country Joy: Theme and Adhesions" (Leo Kottke, John McLaughlin) – 7:00
 "Wheels" (Norman Petty) – 2:20
 "Palms Blvd." – 2:48
 "Strange" – 2:34
 "Jib’s Hat" – 2:24
 "All I Have to Do is Dream" (Boudleaux Bryant, Felice Bryant) – 1:43
 "Memories Are Made of This" (Frank Miller, Richard Dehr, Terry Gilkyson) – 2:37
 "Little Martha" (Duane Allman) – 1:28

Personnel
Leo Kottke - 6 & 12-string guitar, vocals
David Kemper - drums
David Miner - bass

References

External links
Leo Kottke's official site

Leo Kottke compilation albums
2003 compilation albums
Blue Note Records compilation albums
Albums produced by Denny Bruce
Albums produced by T Bone Burnett
Instrumental compilation albums